Fat People is a 2009 Spanish comedy-drama film written and directed by Daniel Sánchez Arévalo. The ensemble cast features Antonio de la Torre, Roberto Enríquez, Verónica Sánchez, Raúl Arévalo, Leticia Herrero, Fernando Albizu, María Morales, Pilar Castro, Adam Jezierski, Marta Martín and Teté Delgado.

Plot 
The plot tracks five personal stories connected to a therapy group managed by Abel that helps people with a condition of obesity.

Cast

Production 
The film was produced by Filmanova and Tesela Producciones Cinematográficas and had the participation of TVE and Canal+.

Release 
It also screened at the Venice Days. Distributed by Alta Films, it was theatrically released in Spain on 11 September 2009.

Accolades 

|-
| rowspan = "17" align = "center" | 2010 || rowspan = "8"  | 24th Goya Awards || Best Actor || Antonio de la Torre ||  || rowspan = "8" | 
|-
| Best Supporting Actor || Raúl Arévalo || 
|-
| rowspan = "2" | Best Supporting Actress || Pilar Castro || 
|-
| Verónica Sánchez || 
|-
| Best Original Screenplay || Daniel Sánchez Arévalo || 
|-
| Best New Actor || Fernando Albizu || 
|-
| Best New Actress || Leticia Herrero || 
|-
| Best Editing || David Pinillos and Nacho Ruiz Capillas || 
|-
| rowspan = "4" | 9th Mestre Mateo Awards || colspan = "2" | Best Feature Film ||  || rowspan = "4" | 
|-
| Best Director || Daniel Sánchez Arévalo || 
|-
| Best Supporting Actress || Teté Delgado || 
|-
| Best Art Direction || Curru Garabal || 
|-
| rowspan = "5" | 19th Actors and Actresses Union Awards || Best Actor in a Leading Role (film) || Antonio de la Torre ||  || rowspan = "5" | 
|-
| Best Actor in a Secondary Role (film) || Raúl Arévalo || 
|-
| Best Actress in a Secondary Role (film) || Verónica Sánchez || 
|-
| Best Actor in a Minor Role (film) || Fernando Albizu || 
|-
| Best Actress in a Minor Role (film) || Pilar Castro || 
|}

See also 
 List of Spanish films of 2009

References

External links 
 
 Fat People at ICAA's Catálogo de Cinespañol

2009 films
2009 comedy-drama films
2000s Spanish-language films
Films about obesity
Spanish comedy-drama films
2000s Spanish films